is a 1980 Japanese thriller starring Yūsaku Matsuda. It was directed by Toru Murakawa and produced by Haruki Kadokawa.

Plot
A journalist who covered the Vietnam War becomes mentally unstable and goes on a spree of robbery and murder.

Cast
Yūsaku Matsuda (journalist)
Takeshi Kaga (waiter, accomplice)
Hideo Murota (policeman)

References

External links

1980 films
Japanese thriller films
1980 thriller films
1980s Japanese films
1980s Japanese-language films